ViVii is a Swedish indie-pop trio, self-described as a "music project based in Stockholm". ViVii is composed of married couple Emil and Caroline Jonsson, alongside Anders Eckborn. “Siv (You and I),” their debut single, is accompanied by a video made through home recordings and disposable cameras. On March 15, 2019, the band released their debut eponymous album. The album has been characterized as "fluttering ethereal indie-pop," and "reminiscent of Belle and Sebastian in its penchant for fairytale-esque storytelling and Lykke Li in its superb use of vocal harmonies."

References 

https://viviiofficial.com/
https://schedule.sxsw.com/2022/artists/2054882
https://open.spotify.com/artist/21m5PZPUgSF0k76W1MMCAa

Swedish indie pop groups